Henry Gordon McMorran (June 11, 1844 – July 19, 1929) was an American Republican politician and businessman.

He served five terms in the U.S. Congress as a U.S. Representative from Michigan's 7th congressional district from March 4, 1903, until March 3, 1913.

Early life and education
McMorran was born in Port Huron, Michigan, where he attended the Crawford Private School.

He married Emma Caroline Williams in October 1866.

Early career
He engaged in the wholesale grocery business in 1865 and also in the milling, grain, and elevator business.

He was a member of the Port Huron board of aldermen in 1867 and was the Port Huron city treasurer in 1875. McMorran was general manager of the Port Huron and Northwestern Railway from 1878 to 1889 and a member of the State canal commission.

U.S. Representative
In 1902, McMorran was elected to the 58th U.S. Congress and was subsequently re-elected to the four succeeding Congresses.   He was chair of the U.S. House Committee on Manufacturers in the 60th and 61st U.S. Congresses.  He was not a candidate for renomination in 1912.

Later life
After leaving the U.S. Congress, McMorran engaged in numerous business enterprises at Port Huron. He organized the Great Lakes Foundry Company, serving as its president.

Death and legacy
McMorran died at his home in Port Huron on July 19, 1929, age 85, and is interred there in Lakeside Cemetery. Port Huron's main sports and concert arena, the McMorran Place is named after him and opened in 1960 in his honor.

References

External links
 The Political Graveyard

1844 births
1929 deaths
Businesspeople from Michigan
Michigan local politicians
City and town treasurers in the United States
People from Port Huron, Michigan
Republican Party members of the United States House of Representatives from Michigan
Burials in Michigan
19th-century American businesspeople
20th-century American businesspeople
20th-century American politicians